Nejib Belkadhi (born May 13, 1976, in Tunis, Tunisia) is a Tunisian actor and director.

Education 
He studied marketing and management at the Carthage High Commercial Studies Institute in Carthage, before he started a career in arts.

Career 
Nejib had his first acting role in Hbiba Msika (Dancer of the Flame), a film by Selma Baccar, in 1995. He then starred in Mohamed Kouka's play Madrasat Nisaa(مدرسة النساء / The Women's School), however, Nejib's best success was in the series El Khottab Al Bab (الخطاب عالباب /Many Fiancees) appearing in both volumes 1 and 2 (1996–1998) for the director Slaheddine Essid.

Nejib Belkadhi began his career in directing during 1998 on the TV network Canal+ Horizons, covering the Carthage Film Festival, before creating the network's most successful TV show: Chams Alik (شمس عليك ), whose concept revolutionized the Tunisian TV scene. He conceived, produced and co-presented the show from 1999 to 2001.

In 2002, he founded Propaganda Productions, with his friend Imed Marzouk, and in 2003 he directed and produced a socio-critical fake reality show called Dima Lebess (ديما لا باس /Always fine), which was broadcast on the Canal21 TV channel.

He directed his first movie in 2005, a short film called Tsawer (تصاور/Pic), with a screenplay of Souad Ben Slimane.

VHS Kahloucha (2006), his first feature documentary film, was screened to great acclaim at international film festivals, including Cannes (2006), Philadelphia (2007), Sundance l (2007) and Dubai (2007), and it was his most successful work to date.

His last movie, Bastardo, was screened at the Toronto International Film Festival in September 2013.

Filmography

Actor

Cinema

Television

Theater 
 1995: The Women's School by Mohamed Kouka

Director

Cinema 
 2005: Tsawer (Pictures) (Short film)
 2006: VHS Kahloucha (Documentary)
 2013: Bastardo (English) (Feature film)
 2014: Seven and a Half (Documentary)
 2018: look at Me (film, 2018) (Feature film)

Television 
 1999–2001: Chams Alik on Canal Horizons+
 2002: Dima Labes on Canal 21
 2008: Weld Ettalyena (Son of The Italian) (TV-Serial) 
 2020: The Host and The Tramp (Web-Serial)

TV shows 
 2013: Klem Ennas (People's Talk) of Lobna Noaman on El Hiwar El Tounsi : Guest of Episode 3 of Season 2
 2014:  : Nejib Belkadhi : "Bastardo is long awaited in Beyrouth" on TV5 Monde : Guest
 2021: Fekret Sami Fehri of Hedy Zaiem on El Hiwar El Tounsi : Guest of Episode 9 of Season 3 Part 4

Producer 
 2006: The Tarzan of the Arabs (Feature Documentary)
 2017: When The Sun Starts To Cry of Kais Mejri

Honours 
 2007: Knight of the Tunisian Order of Merit

References

External links 

Biography from the Sharjah Art Foundation
Actor/Director's Profile on NYTimes.com
Interview with Nejib Belkadhi on Indiewire
Nejib Belkadhi's Movie Bastardo in TIFF-festival 2013

1972 births
People from Tunis
Tunisian film directors
Tunisian male film actors
Living people
Tunisian male television actors
20th-century Tunisian male actors
Carthage High Commercial Studies Institute alumni